In mathematics and statistics, an error term is an additive type of error. Common examples include:

 errors and residuals in statistics, e.g. in linear regression
 the error term in numerical integration

Error measures